Sir Robert Lloyd Patterson (1836–1906) was an  Irish naturalist and linen merchant.

Biography
Patterson was the second son of Robert Patterson F.R.S.
In August 1902, he was awarded a knighthood for services to the Belfast Chamber of Commerce.
Robert Lloyd Patterson wrote several zoological papers in the Irish Naturalist and the Report and Proceedings of the Belfast Natural History and Philosophical Society and a book titled The Birds, Fishes and Cetacea of Belfast Lough (1880).
On his death Robert Lloyd Patterson bequeathed his art collection to the Belfast Corporation. It is now in the Ulster Museum.

Arms

References

Foster, J. W. and Chesney, H. C. G (eds.), 1977. Nature in Ireland: A Scientific and Cultural History. Lilliput Press. .

External links
BHL ''The Birds, Fishes and Cetacea of Belfast Lough 1880
National Library of Ireland
Irish Natural History Literature partial bibliography

Irish zoologists
1836 births
1906 deaths